The Temple Society of Concord, commonly referred to as Temple Concord, is a Reform Jewish congregation located at 910 Madison Street, Syracuse, in the U.S. state of New York. Established in 1839, it is the ninth-oldest still-active Jewish congregation in the United States. Temple Concord, a member of the Union for Reform Judaism, is the leading Reform synagogue in Central New York, and maintains the largest Jewish religious school in the region. Religious services are held every Friday night and Saturday morning, and on Jewish holidays. Religious school and adult education programs take place twice a week. Temple Concord is also the setting for a wide array of educational, cultural and social events the serve then entire Syracuse-area community.

Early history

Temple Concord was founded in 1839 by German immigrants drawn to upstate New York by the new Erie Canal. The small group gathered in a back room of a local store for meetings and worship services. By 1841 they had moved to the second floor of a member's home on Mulberry Street, from where they hired their first religious leader (he was not formally trained or ordained as a rabbi). The group incorporated under the laws of the State of New York on February 24, 1942. and first took the name "Comrades of Peace" and shortly thereafter Keneseth Shalome, which they translated in formal English as Temple Society of Concord.  Incorporation papers list Max Thalheimer, Samuel Bernheimer and Joseph Wiseman as trustees.

Religious leaders and rabbis
In its early years the congregation was served by many religious leaders. These men were referred to as "Reverends" and they served as cantors, teachers, Mohelim, and Schochetim. With the exception of Bernard Illowy, it is doubtful that any were formally trained or ordained as rabbis. Rabbi Adolph Guttman, who emigrated to America from Hohenems, Austria, was the first modern Reform rabbi, and he shaped the liturgy and organization for decades to come.

Congregational Religious Leaders (1841–present)

 Abraham Gunzenhauser (1841-1846)
 Joseph Goodman
 Jacob Levi
 Bernard Illowy
 Herman Berkenthal
 Rev. Deutsch
 Rev. Cohen
 Rev. Burgheimer
 Dr. Adolph Guttman (1883-1918)
 Rabbi Benjamin Friedman (1919-1969)
 Rabbi Theodore S. Levy (1970-1990)
 Rabbi Sheldon Ezring (1990-2009)
 Rabbi Daniel Fellman (2009–present)

Synagogue and related buildings
In 1851, the congregation erected its first purpose-built synagogue building at Harrison and Mulberry Streets. The cost was $10,000, a substantial sum at the time.

The present classical-style sanctuary at the corner of Madison Street and University Avenue, with an attached social hall, was designed by Syracuse-based  architect Alfred Taylor and New York-based consulting architect Arnold W. Brunner. The cornerstone was laid on September 19, 1910  and the building was dedicated on September 23, 1911.  It was built at a cost of $100,000. The social hall was expanded and a classroom building added in the 1920s. The Hiram and Mabel Weisberg Religious School, designed by Edward C. Roock, was built on the east side of the complex and dedicated on February 12, 1961.The Benjamin M. Berinstein Memorial Chapel was built in 1997 inside the former 1920s education building.  Allen Kosoff, a congregant, was the architect, and John Dobbs designed the stained glass windows.

The 1910-11 building was added to the National Register of Historic Places on April 27, 2009. In July 2019, members of the congregation voted to sell the building for $9 million, to be converted into student housing.

See also 
 Ethnic groups in Syracuse, New York
 List of the oldest synagogues in the United States
 Louis Marshall

References

External links

Temple Society of Concord website
ISJM's Historic Home at Temple Society of Concord, Syracuse (NY)
Samuel D. Gruber, "USA: Syracuse, NY, Temple Concord Sanctuary A Century Old: Re-Dedication on September 18, 2011"
Samuel D. Gruber, "Arnold W. Brunner and the New Classical Synagogue in America" Jewish History 25.1 (2011): 69-102.

German-Jewish culture in New York (state)
Synagogues on the National Register of Historic Places in New York (state)
Religious buildings and structures in Syracuse, New York
Reform synagogues in New York (state)
Ethnic groups in Syracuse, New York
National Register of Historic Places in Syracuse, New York